Jagjivan Rao Pant Pratinidhi (also known as Dadoba) served as Pratinidhi (Chief Delegate) during Chhatrapati Shahu I reign. He is the  younger brother of Shripatrao Pant Pratinidhi.He succeeded as Pratinidhi after the death of his brother in 1691 at the age of fifty-five.

Early life
Jagjivan Rao, was born in 1691, the fourth son of Parshuram Pant Pratinidhi.

See also
 Pant Pratinidhi family

References

Bibliography
 
 
 
 
 

People of the Maratha Empire